Robert Reboul (24 July 1893 – 22 January 1969) was a French racing cyclist. He rode in the 1923 Tour de France. He also won the 1921 Paris–Brussels.

References

1893 births
1969 deaths
French male cyclists